Jan Jongbloed (born 25 November 1940) is a Dutch former professional footballer who played as a goalkeeper. He played with the Netherlands national football team.

Career
Jongbloed was born in Amsterdam. He played with DWS (later FC Amsterdam), Roda JC and Go Ahead Eagles. The 707 games he played in the Eredivisie was a record. Jongbloed made 24 appearances for the Netherlands, winning his first cap in 1962 and last in the 1978 FIFA World Cup final. He played with the Netherlands national team at the 1974 and 1978 FIFA World Cups. He retired in 1986 at age 45, due to a heart attack that he suffered while playing, and then worked as a football coach.

Personal life

Jongbloed was married twice and twice divorced; he has a daughter Nicole. His son Eric was also a football goalkeeper with DWS. He was hit by lightning and killed, aged 21, during a match on 23 September 1984.

Honours
DWS
Eredivisie: 1963–64

Netherlands
FIFA World Cup runner-up: 1974, 1978
UEFA European Championship third place: 1976

References

External links

1940 births
Living people
Dutch footballers
Eredivisie players
Netherlands international footballers
Association football goalkeepers
SBV Vitesse managers
AFC DWS players
Go Ahead Eagles players
Roda JC Kerkrade players
1974 FIFA World Cup players
UEFA Euro 1976 players
1978 FIFA World Cup players
Footballers from Amsterdam
FC Amsterdam players
Dutch football managers
Association football coaches